The VS-AT4 and VS-AT4-EL are Italian minimum metal blast resistant anti-tank blast mines. The VS-AT4 uses a blast-resistant mechanical pressure fuze, while the VS-AT4-EL uses a programmable electronic pressure fuze with an integral anti-lifting function.

The electronic fuze in the VS-AT4 has an active life of between one hour and one year which can be set in one-hour increments, at the end of which the mine will either self-destruct or disarm itself.

Specifications
 Length: 280 mm
 Width: 104 mm
 Height: 188 mm
 Weight: 6 kg approx
 Explosive content: 4.5 kg of Composition B

References
 Jane's Mines and Mine Clearance 2005-2006
 

Anti-tank mines of Italy